NS Railway may refer to:

Nederlandse Spoorwegen, railway operator in the Netherlands
Norfolk Southern Railway in the United States